Eitan Bernath (born April 25, 2002) is an American celebrity chef, entertainer, author, social media influencer, TV personality, and entrepreneur. As of February 2023, Bernath has ten million followers across his social media accounts. He is the president and chief executive officer of Eitan Productions and the Principal Culinary Contributor for The Drew Barrymore Show on CBS. He is a regular contributor to The Washington Post, Food & Wine, Saveur, Delish, The Kitchn, Food52, and The Nosher. Bernath frequently appears on the national US daytime circuit on shows including Good Morning America, Today, and Live with Kelly and Ryan. His first cookbook, Eitan Eats the World: New Comfort Classics to Cook Right Now, was published by Penguin Random House and Clarkson Potter on May 3, 2022. Bernath was appointed a High Level Supporter to the United Nations World Food Programme in February 2023. He has been called a "culinary darling" by The New York Times and "the internet’s most delightful chef" by Oprah Magazine. According to Variety, Bernath is the first TikTok star to expand into a recurring role on daytime television. He is the youngest ever individual named to the Forbes 30 Under 30: Food and Drink list.

Personal life
Bernath was born in Teaneck, New Jersey to Sabrina Bernath, a high school math teacher, and Jason Bernath, an occupational therapist. He has a brother named Yoni. Bernath is Jewish and identifies as a Zionist. He developed a passion for food and cooking at a young age and is known to have a love for Indian cuisine. Bernath currently lives in Manhattan.

He has been a frequent guest of The White House under the Biden administration at events including the White House Hanukkah Party and the holiday decoration unveilings. Bernath has worked with Second Gentleman Douglas Emhoff and Dr. Anthony Fauci on social media initiatives.

He is currently pursuing his Bachelor of Arts degree at Columbia University School of General Studies.

Bernath is known to be a close friend of Drew Barrymore.

Career

Food Network 
Bernath began his career with his first television appearance competing on Chopped at the age of 12 while he was attending Yavneh Academy in Paramus, NJ. In 2017, he was a contestant on Guy's Grocery Games, another Food Network show, hosted by Guy Fieri.

TikTok and Instagram 
In 2019, Bernath grew a large following on TikTok. He is known on the platform for his cooking tutorials and is often regarded as one of the platforms most notable food accounts. In an interview with Taylor Lorenz for The New York Times, Bernath explained "TikTok is the biggest thing that happened to me in my career, and honestly is the reason why I am where I am today."

His following also began to grow substantially on Instagram in 2020. He was an early adopter of Instagram Reels.

Bernath performed on TikTok's "#HappyAtHome: Live!" shows in March 2020 alongside Charli D'Amelio, Addison Rae, Tyra Banks, Alicia Keys, and DJ Khaled. He was a featured TikTok creator at VidCon US 2021 in Anaheim, California.

Snapchat 
Bernath hosts three syndicated shows on Snapchat: Eitan Bernath, Eitan's Test Kitchen, and Eitan's Food Lab. According to Tubefilter, the shows accrued 29.2 million unique viewers and 201 million minutes of watch time in 2021.

Representation 
In early 2020, after an increase in his social media followings, Bernath was signed to talent agency William Morris Endeavor and UNCMMN.

Partnerships 
Bernath's brand partners include Warner Brothers, SharkNinja, Cup Noodles, Red Star Yeast, Dreams Resorts & Spas, Chefman, and the government of Thailand.

He partnered with Rachael Ray on a celebrity cooking camp in July 2020.

Bernath performed at the Outside Lands festival in San Francisco in October 2021 with Marc E. Bassy.

Television 
In December 2020, Bernath was appointed the Principal Culinary Contributor for The Drew Barrymore Show on CBS. The New York Post reported that Barrymore discovered Bernath from her daughters who watch his TikTok videos. He has cooked on segments with Jason Derulo, Gordon Ramsay, and Molly Sims. Barrymore and Bernath often try unconventional food combinations, which Barrymore has said is "one of my favorite things to do on the show."

Bernath frequently appears on talk shows including Good Morning America, Live with Kelly and Ryan, The Good Dish, and The Marilyn Dennis Show. He was a guest on A Little Late with Lilly Singh on NBC on May 19, 2021.

Editorial work 
Bernath frequently contributes to a variety of food publications. He writes for The Washington Post, Food & Wine, Saveur, Delish, The Kitchn, Food52, and The Nosher. He has also contributed to the Houston Chronicle, The Forward, The Jewish Standard, and Kosher.com.

Charity work

World Food Programme 
Bernath was appointed a High Level Supporter to the United Nations World Food Programme on February 23, 2023.

City Harvest 
Bernath has been a member of the City Harvest Food Council since November 2021. He is the youngest member on the council. He co-chairs and serves on the host committee of a variety of the organizations annual fundraising events. In November 2022, Bernath was a juror for the Canstruction competition at Brookfield Place benefiting the organization.

Animal Haven 
He serves as an ambassador for Animal Haven, a New York city animal rescue organization.

India 
Bernath visited Patna, India in December 2022 in partnership with various Indian government agencies to support poverty alleviation initiatives in Bihar. A video following the trip of Bernath and Bill Gates preparing Roti went viral internationally on social media, with Prime Minister Narendra Modi sharing the video on his personal Instagram account.

Accolades 
Bernath has been profiled by publications including The New York Times, The Hollywood Reporter, Variety, Teen Vogue, The New York Post, Business Insider, People Magazine, Quartz, Delish Magazine, Rolling Stone, and Vanity Fair.

In December 2021, Bernath was named to the Forbes 30 Under 30 list in the Food & Drink category. He is the youngest individual ever named to the Food & Drink list. He was also named to the Forbes Next 1000 list in September 2021.

He was named to the Algemeiner's J100 list in December 2022 and the New York Jewish Week's 36 Under 36 in June 2018.

Published works

Eitan Eats the World: New Comfort Classics to Cook Right Now (2022) 
His first cookbook, Eitan Eats the World: New Comfort Classics to Cook Right Now, a national bestseller, was published on May 3, 2022, by Clarkson Potter, an imprint of Penguin Random House. The book is focused around Bernath's passions for international cuisine and comfort food. The book contains 85 recipes.

The book was featured on outlets including The Washington Post, USA Today, Bloomberg, CBS News, Associated Press, Delish, Parade, Oprah Magazine, Entrepreneur, Chicago Sun-Times, PureWow, Yahoo! News, Shondaland, The Kitchn, The Pioneer Woman, and Tablet. It received critical acclaim from the Jewish Book Council and The Jerusalem Post.

Bernath's mid-2022 book tour included events at the 92nd Street Y, the Streicker Center, the JCC of Greater Rochester, Katz JCC, and the Teaneck Library.

On June 6, 2022, Bernath spoke at Talks at Google, discussing the book's origin and editorial development.

Eitan Productions 

Bernath is the chief executive officer of Eitan Productions, the production studio responsible for producing his content on social media. The company is based in New York City and employs a team of producers who manage his media businesses.

According to Forbes, the company reaches 300 million consumers annually. The company employs a team of 7.

In February 2021, the company hired Olivia Anderson, formerly of Vox Media, to lead the companies culinary operations.

Filmography

References

External links
 
 
 
 

American TikTokers
American YouTubers
2002 births
21st-century American businesspeople
Jewish activists
Jewish American writers
Jewish feminists
Living people
Frisch School alumni
People from Teaneck, New Jersey
21st-century American Jews